The Tenth Symphony is a 1918 silent French drama film directed by Abel Gance.

Plot
Rich orphan Eve Dinant has fallen under the spell of the charming but evil Fred Rice. She becomes his mistress and he induces her to murder his sister. She rapidly understands that she cannot go on living with such a despicable man and decides to leave him. She gives him money to buy his silence.

A couple of years later, she meets the famous composer Enric Damor and they get married. Enric's daughter, Claire, meets by chance Fred and falls in love with him. With Enric's approval, Fred proposes marriage and comes frequently to visit his fiancée. Eve is determined not to let Fred marry Claire and, as he refuses to listen to her, she tells her husband that the wedding must not take place. Enric does not understand his wife's behaviour and when Fred let him find a letter sent by Claire to him, he asks her whether she is in love with Fred. Rather than confessing her past, Eve tells him that she does love him.

Enric is flabbergasted when he hears about his wife's betrayal, but he sublimates his sufferings to create a masterpiece, his Tenth Symphony, on the theme of Women's betrayal. Fred offers Eve not to marry Claire if she comes back to him. She accepts and he writes a curt breakup letter to his fiancée. Enric is devastated with his wife's absence and Claire goes to Fred's house, determined to take revenge and have Eve come back. She threatens him with a gun but Eve tries to dissuade her from killing him. While they are arguing, Fred draws his own gun and after pointing it at them, turns it against himself and shoots himself. Eve tells Claire how she had shot Fred's sister in the same room. Eve can now go back to Enric, her true love.

Cast
 Séverin-Mars as Composer Enric Damor
 Jean Toulout as Frederic 'Fred' Ryce
 Emmy Lynn as Eve Dinant
 Ariane Hugon as Dancer
 André Lefaur as Marquis de Groix St-Blaise
 Elizabeth Nizan as Claire Damor

Production
This film was produced by the production company Le Film d'Art in 1917. Because of the war, it was only released in November 1918.

References

External links

1918 films
1918 drama films
French drama films
1910s French-language films
French silent feature films
French black-and-white films
Films directed by Abel Gance
Silent drama films